Jmol is computer software for molecular modelling chemical structures in 3-dimensions. Jmol returns a 3D representation of a molecule that may be used as a teaching tool, or for research e.g., in chemistry and biochemistry.
It is written in the programming language Java, so it can run on the operating systems Windows, macOS, Linux, and Unix, if Java is installed. It is free and open-source software released under a GNU Lesser General Public License (LGPL) version 2.0. A standalone application and a software development kit (SDK) exist that can be integrated into other Java applications, such as Bioclipse and Taverna.

A popular feature is an applet that can be integrated into web pages to display molecules in a variety of ways.
For example, molecules can be displayed as ball-and-stick models, space-filling models, ribbon diagrams, etc.
Jmol supports a wide range of chemical file formats, including Protein Data Bank (pdb), Crystallographic Information File (cif), MDL Molfile (mol), and Chemical Markup Language (CML). There is also a JavaScript-only (HTML5) version, JSmol, that can be used on computers with no Java.

The Jmol applet, among other abilities, offers an alternative to the Chime plug-in, which is no longer under active development. While Jmol has many features that Chime lacks, it does not claim to reproduce all Chime functions, most notably, the Sculpt mode. Chime requires plug-in installation and Internet Explorer 6.0 or Firefox 2.0 on Microsoft Windows, or Netscape Communicator 4.8 on Mac OS 9. Jmol requires Java installation and operates on a wide variety of platforms. For example, Jmol is fully functional in Mozilla Firefox, Internet Explorer, Opera, Google Chrome, and Safari.


Screenshots

See also 

 Chemistry Development Kit (CDK)
 Comparison of software for molecular mechanics modeling
List of free and open-source software packages
 List of molecular graphics systems
 Molecular graphics
 Molecule editor
 Proteopedia
 PyMOL
 SAMSON
 SMILES

References

External links 

 

 Wiki with listings of websites, wikis, and moodles
 
 Jmol extension for MediaWiki
Biomodel
Molview

Chemistry software for Linux
Free chemistry software
Free software programmed in Java (programming language)
Molecular modelling software